Contra Costa College is a public community college in San Pablo, California. It is the west campus of the Contra Costa Community College District. It is part of the California community colleges system, one of the three college systems in California.

History 
The college was founded as West Contra Costa Junior College in 1949, with the first classes held in the spring of 1950 at a temporary location in the shuttered Kaiser Shipyards in Richmond, California. In 1957, a permanent campus was opened on Mission Bell Drive in downtown San Pablo.

The college is flanked by Abella Center to the south.

Middle College High School 
The college campus is also home to Middle College High School, whose students take college classes in addition to regular high school courses.  The high school is part of the West Contra Costa Unified School District. The current principal is Finy Prak.

Restaurants 
The campus has three places that serve food. Pronto is an inexpensive restaurant that serves food prepared by culinary students. Aquaterra Grill is a high-end, sit-in restaurant. Brix is a moderately priced cafe that serves lunch-time classics.

Notable graduates 
Courtney Anderson, NFL tight end
Benny Barnes, NFL cornerback
Robert Campbell - former member of the state Assembly (1980-1996)
Chris Dixon, first indoor football quarterback to throw 500 touchdowns
John Kiffmeyer, (also known as Al Sobrante), the original drummer for the punk rock band Green Day
Joe Koontz, NFL wide receiver
Pumpsie Green, MLB first black player to play for the Boston Red Sox
Jim Landis, MLB center fielder
Rick Tittle, sports radio host
Chris Roberson, Philadelphia Phillies player
Travis Williams, NFL running back
Jeff Gerstmann, video game journalist (attended)

References

External links 

 Contra Costa College - official site
 Middle College High School
 The Advocate - student newspaper

California Community Colleges
Educational institutions established in 1950
San Pablo, California
Universities and colleges in Contra Costa County, California
Schools accredited by the Western Association of Schools and Colleges
1950 establishments in California